In enzymology, a 1,2-diacylglycerol 3-glucosyltransferase is an enzyme that catalyzes the chemical reaction

UDP-glucose + 1,2-diacylglycerol  UDP + 3-D-glucosyl-1,2-diacylglycerol

Thus, the two substrates of this enzyme are UDP-glucose and 1,2-diacylglycerol, whereas its two products are UDP and 3-D-glucosyl-1,2-diacylglycerol.

This enzyme belongs to the family of glycosyltransferases, specifically the hexosyltransferases.  The systematic name of this enzyme class is UDP-glucose:1,2-diacylglycerol 3-D-glucosyltransferase. Other names in common use include UDP-glucose:diacylglycerol glucosyltransferase, UDP-glucose:1,2-diacylglycerol glucosyltransferase, uridine diphosphoglucose-diacylglycerol glucosyltransferase, and UDP-glucose-diacylglycerol glucosyltransferase.  This enzyme participates in glycerolipid metabolism.

References

 

EC 2.4.1
Enzymes of unknown structure